Oh Ha-na (born January 8, 1985, in Seongnam, Gyeonggi-do) is a female fencer from South Korea. She won the bronze medal at the 2012 Summer Olympics in the Women's team foil event.

References

South Korean female foil fencers
Living people
Olympic fencers of South Korea
Fencers at the 2012 Summer Olympics
Olympic bronze medalists for South Korea
Olympic medalists in fencing
1985 births
Medalists at the 2012 Summer Olympics
Asian Games medalists in fencing
Fencers at the 2010 Asian Games
People from Seongnam
Fencers at the 2014 Asian Games
Asian Games gold medalists for South Korea
Medalists at the 2010 Asian Games
Medalists at the 2014 Asian Games
Universiade medalists in fencing
Universiade silver medalists for South Korea
Sportspeople from Gyeonggi Province